Birati is a locality in North Dumdum of North 24 Parganas district in the Indian state of West Bengal. It is a part of the area covered by Kolkata Metropolitan Development Authority (KMDA).

History
Nimta-Birati area was a well known Janapada since the days of Laksmikanta Roy Choudhury. Later after his death in 1649, it became the capital of Laksmikanta's jagir and remained the administrative headquarters till 1716 when the capital was shifted to Barisha. Still Birati remains an abode of the Sabarna Roy Choudhury family.

Geography and locality

Birati is bound by the Jessore Road in the East, Belgharia in the West, New Barrackpore in the North and Durganagar in the South. It also features a railway station. Its closeness to Dum Dum also adds the Kolkata Metro as a way of conveyance.

Education
Mrinalini Dutta Mahavidyapith (more commonly known as the Birati college) is the only college in Birati.
 
 Birati High School(Boys)
 Birati Mahajati Vidyamandir(Boys)
 Birati Mahajati Balika Vidyamandir (H.S)
 Birati Vidyalay for Boys' (H.S)
 Birati Vidyalay for Girls' (H.S)
 Uttar Dum Dum Vidyapith for Boys'
 Uttar Dum Dum Vidyapith for Girls'
 Uttarayan Sishu Vidyatan (Primary school)
 Rajanikanta Shiksha Sadan (Primary School)
 Vidya Bharati School(Primary School)
•Literacy : 92%

Transport

By air
Birati is close to Netaji Subhash Chandra Bose International Airport.

By road
Kolkata-Siliguri highway passes through Birati. Here Belgharia express way 
is near from Birati. Birati also has the 237 and Birati Mini Bus which goes to Babughat and B.B.D and saltlake..

By rail
Birati railway station on the Sealdah–Bangaon line serves the area. Birati will soon be connected with the Noapara-Barasat Yellow Line Line 4 of Kolkata Metro. The metro station will be underneath Jessore Road at Birati More.

Notable residents
 Mihir Sen: Writer

References

External links

Cities and towns in North 24 Parganas district
Neighbourhoods in North 24 Parganas district
Neighbourhoods in Kolkata
Kolkata Metropolitan Area